George Trakas is a sculptor who was born in Quebec City in 1944 and has lived in New York City since 1963. Many of his projects are site-specific installations, and he describes himself as an environmental sculptor.  He often recycles local materials and incorporates them into his work.

Notable recent examples of his work include a waterfront nature walk at the Newtown Creek Wastewater Treatment Plant in Brooklyn, New York; another waterfront installation adjacent to the Dia:Beacon museum in Beacon, New York; and public art in the New York City Subway at the Atlantic Avenue – Barclays Center station.

Trakas taught sculpture at Yale University for 13 years and has also taught at other schools.  He graduated from Sir George Williams University in Montreal and then went on to earn a bachelor's degree in art history at New York University in 1969.  He received a Guggenheim Fellowship in 1982, a National Endowment for the Arts Fellowship in 1989, and the American Academy of Arts and Letters Medal for Sculpture in 1996. Emory University awarded him an honorary doctorate in 2011. He also won the Foundation for Contemporary Arts Grants to Artists award (2017).

George Trakas married Susan Rothenberg, a painter, in 1971. Their daughter Maggie was born in 1972. They divorced in 1979 but remained close until Rothenberg's death in 2020.

List of works
The following table contains a partial list of works by George Trakas.

Gallery

References

1944 births
Living people
20th-century American sculptors
Artists from Quebec City
Canadian contemporary artists
Canadian sculptors
Canadian male sculptors
New York University alumni
People from New York City
Sir George Williams University alumni
21st-century American sculptors
Canadian abstract artists